Imanol Sarriegi Isasa (born 27 April 1995) is a Spanish footballer who plays as a central midfielder for CD Calahorra.

Club career
Born in San Sebastián, Gipuzkoa, Basque Country, Sarriegi represented Antiguoko and Real Sociedad as a youth. He was promoted to the latter's reserves on 23 June 2014, but opted to join RCD Mallorca B shortly after, being immediately loaned to Peña Sport FC.

Sarriegi returned to Mallorca in July 2015, but moved to another reserve team, CD Vitoria, on 30 December. He made his debut for the first team – SD Eibar – on 12 January 2017, starting in a 0–0 home draw against CA Osasuna for the Copa del Rey. His first La Liga appearance took place on 5 November, when he came on as a 59th-minute substitute in the 1–3 away loss to Real Sociedad, being booked late in the match.

On 9 July 2018, Sarriegi moved abroad for the first time in his career, joining Bahraini Premier League side East Riffa Club.

On 30 June 2021, he joined Primera División RFEF club Calahorra.

Personal life
Sarriegi's younger brother, Oier (born 1997), is also a footballer. A forward, he too began at Antiguoko before being signed by Athletic Bilbao in 2015, serving loans and moving on to Deportivo Alavés two years later. Their sister Amaiur Sarriegi (born 2000) plays in midfield for Real Sociedad Femenino having also played for Añorga KKE and Athletic Bilbao.

References

External links

1995 births
Living people
Spanish footballers
Footballers from San Sebastián
Association football midfielders
La Liga players
Segunda División B players
Primera Federación players
Tercera División players
Antiguoko players
RCD Mallorca B players
Peña Sport FC footballers
CD Vitoria footballers
SD Eibar footballers
SD Ejea players
CD Tudelano footballers
CD Calahorra players
Bahraini Premier League players
East Riffa Club players
Spanish expatriate footballers
Spanish expatriate sportspeople in Bahrain
Expatriate footballers in Bahrain